"Despechá" (short for  ) is a song by Spanish singer and songwriter Rosalía. It was released on 28 July 2022 by Columbia Records as a single from Motomami +, the deluxe version of her third studio album Motomami. The song was written by Rosalía, reggaeton veterans Chris Jedi, Gaby Music, and el Kagueto del Guetto, along with Motomami producers David Rodríguez, Noah Goldstein and Dylan Patrice. "Despechá" is a mambo track, with merengue and electropop elements, about "the joys of leaving work and toxic men behind to hit the club."

The song was met with great commercial success upon release, earning the biggest streaming debut for a Spanish-language song by a female artist in Spotify history. "Despechá" topped the charts in Spain, Panama and Uruguay, while also hitting the top ten in seventeen other countries. It became Rosalía's first solo entry on the Billboard Hot 100 and her highest charting single on the Billboard Global 200.

A remix with American rapper Cardi B was released on 16 December 2022.

Background

In March 2022, Rosalía released her third studio album Motomami, which saw a departure from the new flamenco sound of its predecessor and an embracement of Latin music in an avant-garde and experimental key. The album spawned the singles "La Fama", "Saoko", and "Chicken Teriyaki" and was met with great commercial and critical success, later becoming the best reviewed and most discussed album of the year on Metacritic. To further promote the record, the singer embarked on the Motomami World Tour, scheduled to visit seventeen countries from July to December 2022.

The opening night of the tour at the Recinto Ferial in Almería unveiled three unreleased tracks, a number that was expanded to four after the stop in Seville. Two of them have been confirmed to be discarded songs from Motomami while and one was specifically been written for tour season. "Despechá" (at the time known as "Lao a Lao" by fans), is performed between a 4-minute classic reggaeton medley that blends Lorna's "Papi Chulo" and "Gasolina" with Rosalía's "TKN" and "Yo x Ti, Tu x Mi"; and the unreleased track "Aislamiento". During the medley and "Despechá", Rosalía brings up onstage twenty fans previously selected by her logistic team to dance with her and the eight-men 'motopapi' crew, marking the performance a highlight within the show.

"Despechá" became a fan favorite, and videos of the performance were shared on TikTok. On 12 July, Rosalía posted a TikTok video teasing the studio version of the song. During the 19 July show in Madrid, the singer asked the audience whether they preferred the track to be titled "Despechá" or "Lao a Lao" to which the audience responded with the former. After performing it at her show in Bilbao on 27 July, Rosalía revealed that "Despechá" would be released on digital platforms that same night.

Composition
"Despechá" is a mambo track with merengue and electropop elements that runs for two minutes and thirty-seven seconds. Described by Pitchfork as "a wonder of efficiency, flitting back and forth between two springy piano chords as it rides an equally fleet percussive rhythm", the song is about leaving work and heartbreak behind to have fun with one's friends in the club and see life in the most hedonist way possible. Lyrical references include Fefita la Grande and Dominican singer Omega, who was originally featured on the track.

About the song, Rosalía has stated that "there are many ways to be , in this theme it is from the freeness or the craziness, moving without reservations or regrets. This is the place from where I make music, from where I did it when I first started and where I will continue to until God says so. I'm grateful for having been able to travel in recent years and have learned from music from other places including the [Dominican Republic], where artists like Fefita la Grande, Juan Luis Guerra, and Omega have inspired me and without them this song would not exist."

Music video 
Rosalía shared a preview of the music video on 9 August 2022. The video itself premiered on the singer's YouTube channel the day after. It is the third music video in Rosalía's videography to be directed by Mitch Ryan, after "Hentai" and "Delirio de Grandeza". Inspired in the photographic collections Benidorm and Life's a Beach, by Martin Parr, as well as in Spanish costumbrismo, it features Rosalía and her Motomami World Tour dance crew during a fun beach day in the Palma neighbourhood of Portixol, in Mallorca.

Credits and personnel

Production
 Rosalia Vila – production, lyrics, composition; vocals, beat, vocal arrangement
 Chris Jedi – production, composition, beat
 David Rodríguez – production, composition, additional production
 Noah Goldstein – production, composition, drums
 Dylan Patrice – production, composition, piano
 Gaby Music – production, composition
 Dimelo Ninow – composition

Technical personnel
 Manny Marroquin – mixing engineer
 Zach Peraya – assistant mix engineer
 Jeremie Inhaber – assistant mix engineer
 Anthony Vilchis – assistant mix engineer
 Chris Gehringer – mastering engineer

Charts

Weekly charts

Year-end charts

Certifications

See also
List of Billboard Hot Latin Songs and Latin Airplay number ones of 2022

Release history

References

2022 singles
2022 songs
Columbia Records singles
Music videos shot in Spain
Rosalía songs
Songs about dancing
Songs about parties
Songs written by Rosalía
Songs written by Chris Jedi
Spanish-language songs